For altid (Forever) is the fourth studio album released by Danish-Chilean electropop singer Medina. It was released in Denmark on 19 September 2011 through Labelmade, A:larm and Universal Music, peaking at number 2 on the Danish Albums Chart. Three singles of this album have peaked at number 1 on the Danish Singles Chart, and the other singles were all in the top ten.

Singles
"For altid" was released on 30 May 2011 as the lead single from the album. It peaked on number 1 for five consecutive weeks on the Danish Singles Chart and was certified platinum. "Synd for dig" was released on 19 September 2011 as the second single from the album. It peaked on number 1 on the Danish Singles Chart and was also certified platinum. "Kl. 10" was released on 31 October 2011 as the third single from the album. It peaked on number 1 for five consecutive weeks on the Danish Singles Chart. "12 dage" was released as the fourth single on 26 March 2012. It peaked on number 8 on the Danish Singles Chart being the first single of the album to not reach number one. "Lyser i mørke" was released on 12 July 2012 as the fifth single from the album. The video for the song was filmed in early June 2012, and premiered the same day of the release of this single. It peaked on number 5 on the Danish Single Charts and was certified gold. "Har Du Glemt" was released as the first single of the re-release of "For Altid" and the sixth single overall. It peaked on number 4 on the Danish Single Charts.

Track listing

Special Edition
The album was re-released as a "Special Edition" on October 29, 2012. The release contains all tracks of the standard edition and additional 11 new tracks, four of them being new recorded songs, Lågsus a song by Danish hip-hop group Specktors in which Medina is featured, five remixes of the singles and a remix of "Jeg Venter".

Chart performance
The album entered the charts on September 23, 2011 at number 3. The next week it reached its peak-position on number 2, where it stayed for one week. After 54 consecutive weeks the album drop-off the charts. It re-entered the charts on November 9, 2012 after the release of the Special edition of "For Altid" on number 6. As of December 21, 2012 the album sold more than 30,000 copies in Denmark, thus being certified platinum.

Charts and certifications

Charts

Year-end charts

Certifications

Release history

References

2011 albums
Medina (singer) albums